Joseph Tomelty (5 March 1911 – 7 June 1995) was an Irish actor, playwright, novelist, short-story writer and theatre manager. He worked in film, television, radio and on the stage, starring in Sam Thompson's 1960 play Over the Bridge.

Life and career
Born in Portaferry (Ireland at the time, now Northern Ireland) in 1911, he was the son of James Tomelty; a skilled fiddler who was nicknamed "Rollicking". Tomelty's exposure to music at a young age influenced his work as a playwright with several of his stage works being named after songs, including The Singing Bird (1948), Down the Heather Glen (1953) and The Drunken Sailor (1954). His brother, Peter Tomelty, was a tenor and recording artist. He married Lena Milligan in 1942.
They had two daughters together; Frances Tomelty is an actress and the first wife of singer and musician Sting, while Roma Tomelty was also an actress.

Works

Plays
Barnum Was Right (1939)
Idolatry at Inishargie (1942)
Poor Errand (1943)
Right Again Barnum (1943)
The End House (1944)
All Souls' Night (1948)
The Singing Bird (1948)
Down the Heather Glen (1953)
April in Assagh (1954)
The Drunken Sailor (1954)
Is the Priest at Home? (1954)
A Year in Marlfield (1965)

Novels
Red Is the Port Light (1948)
The Apprentice (1953)

Radio
Barnum Is Right (1938)
Elopement (1939)
The McCooeys (1948)

Complete filmography

 Odd Man Out (1947) - 'Gin' Jimmy, the cabbie
 Shark Island (1951) - Seán
 Treasure Hunt (1952) - Poacher
 The Sound Barrier (1952) - Will Sparks
 You're Only Young Twice (1952) - Dan McEntee
 The Gentle Gunman (1952) - Dr Brannigan
 The Gentle Maiden (1953 TV movie) - John Clarke
 The Oracle (1953) - Terry Roche
 Melba (1953) - Thomas Mitchell
 Meet Mr. Lucifer (1953) - Mr. Pedelty
 Hell Below Zero (1954) - Capt. McPhee
 Front Page Story (1954) - Dan
 Hobson's Choice (1954) - Jim Heeler
 Devil Girl from Mars (1954) - Prof. Arnold Hennessey
 Happy Ever After (1954) - Dooley
 The Young Lovers (1954) - Moffatt
 Simba (1955) - Dr. Hughes
 Bedevilled (1955) - Father Cunningham
 A Kid for Two Farthings (1955) - Vagrant
 John and Julie (1955) - Mr. Davidson
 Timeslip (1955) - Detective Inspector Cleary
 A Prize of Gold (1955) - Uncle Dan
 Moby Dick (1956) - Peter Coffin (voice dubbed by John Huston)
 A Night to Remember (1958) - Dr. William O'Loughlin
 Tread Softly Stranger (1958) - Joe Ryan
 The Captain's Table (1959) - Dalrymple
 Upstairs and Downstairs (1959) - Arthur Farringdon
 Next to No Wife (1959 TV movie) - Canon Fergus Brodie
 Life Is a Circus (1960) - Joe Winter
 Hell Is a City (1960) - Furnisher Steele
 The Day They Robbed the Bank of England (1960) - Cohoun
 Lancelot and Guinevere (1963) - Sir Kaye
 The Black Torment (1964) - Sir Giles Fordyke

The McCooeys
Tumelty's family-based radio sitcom The McCooeys was first broadcast on the BBC Home Service in Northern Ireland on 14 May 1949, becoming the region's most listened-to programme over the next six years. Centre Stage Theatre Company, co-founded by his daughter Roma and her husband Colin Carnegie, revived four of the episodes in a stage version, directed by Michael Quinn and performed in the refurbished Grand Opera House Studio Theatre in February 2022.

References

External links

Portaferry - Joseph Tomelty Resource Page

1911 births
1995 deaths
People from Portaferry
Male stage actors from Northern Ireland
Male dramatists and playwrights from Northern Ireland
20th-century British dramatists and playwrights
20th-century male actors from Northern Ireland
20th-century novelists from Northern Ireland
Male novelists from Northern Ireland
20th-century British male writers